"Never Been in Love" is the final single by American pop rock band Cobra Starship. It features vocals from Swedish dance-pop duo Icona Pop. The song was the band's first single since their 2012 single “1Nite (One Night)“. "Never Been in Love" borrowed a prominent piano melody from Fatboy Slim's 1999 single "Praise You".

Composition
"Never Been in Love" is a dance pop and pop rock song that lasts for three minutes and forty two seconds. The song is set in common time with a tempo of 121 beats per minute is in the key of C major, with a chord progression of C-G-D, and Bb-F-C-G in the bridge and outro.

Track listing

Chart performance

References

2014 songs
Songs written by Norman Cook
Songs written by John Ryan (musician)
Cobra Starship songs
Songs written by Ricky Reed